Atkinson Hall is a historic building at Georgia College in Milledgeville, Georgia. Atkinson Hall was constructed in 1896. It was saved from demolition in 1978 by alumni, community support, faculty, and students. The building was home to the college's J. Whitney Bunting College of Business and is named for William Y. Atkinson and his wife, Susan Cobb Milton Atkinson. Susan Atkinson was involved in advancing women's education after communicating with her journalist friend, Julia Flisch. Atkinson persuaded her husband, a state legislator from Meriwether County, Georgia (and future governor), to create legislation establishing Georgia Normal & Industrial College in 1889. The building was added to the National Register of Historic Places on January 20, 1972.

See also
National Register of Historic Places listings in Baldwin County, Georgia

References

Buildings and structures in Baldwin County, Georgia
Milledgeville, Georgia
National Register of Historic Places in Baldwin County, Georgia
University and college buildings completed in 1896
University and college buildings on the National Register of Historic Places in Georgia (U.S. state)
Georgia College & State University
1896 establishments in Georgia (U.S. state)